Cyclophorus zebrinus is a species of gastropods belonging to the family Cyclophoridae.

The species is found in Southern Asia.

References

Cyclophoridae
Gastropods described in 1836
Gastropods of Asia